In 1977, the Utah State Legislature changed its system of how state route numbers were used and assigned. Prior to 1977 Utah used a system where every U.S. Highway and Interstate Highway traversing the state was assigned a different Utah state route number. This state route number was not posted on signs, but was only used for legislative purposes, such as funding. There were many instances where having different route numbers for signing and legislative purposes could cause confusion. For example, the highway signed Interstate 15 in Utah was legislatively defined State Route 1, not route 15. State Route 15 also existed, but was a different route that passed through Zion National Park.

In 1977, the state changed to a system where all highways would have the same legislative route number as its signed route number. For example, Interstate 15 would also be route 15 for legislative purposes. Many state routes were re-numbered to eliminate instances where a state route used the same number as a U.S. Highway or Interstate Highway traversing the state. 

In cases where two or more routes overlapped, only one of the route numbers sharing the same roadbed would be used in the legislative designation. The other routes in the overlap would have a discontinuity in the legislative description. For example, the stretch of highway between Green River and Crescent Junction is legislatively designated only Interstate 70. The other highways using this same pavement, U.S. Route 6, U.S. Route 50 and U.S. Route 191 all have legislative gaps in their routes for this portion. 

A smaller change was codifying State Route 30 into law, which was informally created years earlier by combining other state routes. Though the law was changed in 1977, most signs changed over in 1978.

References

External links
Utah Department of Transportation, Highway Resolutions This site has a PDF for every state route with its former and current legislative route.
Utah Highways by Dan Stober Personal website with an overview of most state routes in Utah, including pre 1977-8 designations.

 Renumbering
Utah State Route Renumbering, 1977
Utah State Route Renumbering, 1977
1977 renumbering
1977 establishments in Utah
1977 disestablishments in Utah
Highway renumbering in the United States